USS Curtis Wilbur (DDG-54) is the fourth  guided missile destroyer. Curtis Wilbur was named for Curtis D. Wilbur, forty-third Secretary of the Navy, who served under President Calvin Coolidge. In 2016, she was based at Yokosuka, Japan, as part of Destroyer Squadron 15.

Built by Bath Iron Works in Bath, Maine, she was commissioned in Long Beach, California, on 19 March 1994. The keynote speaker for the ceremony was then-Secretary of the Navy, John H. Dalton.

Service history

1990s
During the summer of 1994, Curtis Wilbur participated in RIMPAC '94, a major multi-national exercise involving more than thirty ships as well as numerous submarines and air assets, both carrier- and land-based. During this exercise, she performed duties as Force Air Defense Coordinator. Also that summer, the Board of Inspection and Survey conducted Final Contract Trials to assess the material status of the ship. Curtis Wilbur became the first ship of the class, and only the second ship ever to complete the examination with zero mission degrading deficiencies.

In October 1994, Curtis Wilbur became the first Aegis-equipped ship to integrate women into the crew.

Curtis Wilbur departed on her first Western Pacific Deployment on 31 July 1995, transiting the Pacific and heading to the Persian Gulf. While deployed with the United States Naval Forces Central Command, she supported Operations Southern Watch and Vigilant Sentinel. During her 100 days in theater, she served as Air Warfare Commander, Surface Warfare Commander, Undersea Warfare Commander, and Strike Warfare Commander. Curtis Wilbur also served as a member of the United States Fifth Fleet Expeditionary Task Force supporting United Nations sanctions against Iraq.

In September 1996, Curtis Wilbur became part of the United States Seventh Fleet, shifting homeports from San Diego to Yokosuka Naval Base in Yokosuka, Japan. Upon arrival in Japan, she successfully completed Tailored Ship's Training Availability II and III and was the first ship ever to validate the Final Evaluation Period. On 15 February 1997, she deployed with the  Battle Group and participated in exercises Tandem Thrust '97 and Cobra Gold. Curtis Wilbur served as the Air Warfare Commander during this deployment.

Throughout the remainder of 1997, Curtis Wilbur participated in numerous Seventh Fleet exercises, including Javelin Maker, Missilex 97-4, Aswex 97-6JA, Harmex 97-2, Annualex 09G, and Comptuex. For her "contributions to the fleet", Curtis Wilbur was selected as the Destroyer Squadron Fifteen Battle Efficiency Winner for 1997.

In January 1998, Curtis Wilbur participated in Sharem 108-1 before deploying again, on short notice, to the South Pacific. During this deployment, Curtis Wilbur visited ports in Singapore, Australia, Guam, Hong Kong, South Korea and Japan. She also participated in Merlion '98 and the Shimoda Black Ship Festival.

In June 1998 Curtis Wilbur commenced her second Selected Restricted Availability (SRA) in Yokosuka. This nine-week shipyard period brought with it many new upgrades, including JTIDS (Link 16), JMCIS 98, INMARSAT B, and numerous other Engineering and Combat System upgrades, making her the most capable destroyer in Seventh Fleet.

Upon completion of SRA and sea trials in August 1998, in addition to beginning the training cycle, Curtis Wilbur deployed for the joint and combined Exercise FOAL Eagle '98 with the Republic of Korea Navy and completed a successful Cruise Missile Tactical Qualification and Naval Surface Fire Support qualification. During the training cycle the ship certified the Main Space Fire Drill for ECERT at TSTA II and had a near flawless performance during ECERT. After completing her second complete training cycle while forward deployed, Curtis Wilbur participated in Sharem 127 with the Korean Navy and deployed in March 1999 with the  Battle Group.

After completing Tandem Thrust '99, an annual multi-national training exercise, Curtis Wilbur received immediate tasking to proceed at best speed en route to the Persian Gulf. Proceeding directly to the Northern Persian Gulf, Curtis Wilbur commenced operations in support of Operation Southern Watch; enforcing the Southern No-Fly Zone over Iraq and supporting United Nations Sanctions against Iraq by conducting Maritime Interception Operations (MIO) as a member of the Fifth Fleet. Curtis Wilbur also participated in two major exercises while on her second Persian Gulf deployment: Nautical Swimmer '99, a combined exercise with the Royal Saudi Naval Forces, and Sharem 128, an undersea warfare exercise in the North Arabian Sea. Following port visits to Bunbury, Australia and Pattaya, Thailand, Curtis Wilbur returned to Yokosuka, Japan on 25 August 1999.

2000s

On 1 October 2001, Curtis Wilbur again departed Yokosuka on another deployment. Assigned to the Kitty Hawk Strike Group, she conducted operations in support of Operation Enduring Freedom in the Persian Gulf. After a port visit to Phuket, Thailand, Curtis Wilburs first port visit in ten months, from 13 to 15 December, the ship returned to Yokosuka on 23 December 2001.

The Missilex took place on 7 and 8 February, in a training area off the island of Okinawa, with all the ships participating except John Ericsson and Sagami, which had conducted replenishments at sea with several ships earlier in the exercise.

On 30 June 2007, Curtis Wilbur collided with a Russian Udaloy-class destroyer while docking in Vladivostok, Russia, sustaining minor damage. In March 2011, in company with the aircraft carrier , the ship was deployed off northeastern Honshu, Japan to assist with relief efforts after the 2011 Tōhoku earthquake and tsunami. During that time, the ship may have been exposed to leaking radiation from the Fukushima I nuclear accidents.

In January 2016, Curtis Wilbur sailed within  of the disputed Triton Island in the South China Sea as part a planned series of Freedom of navigation operations (also referred to as FONOPs). On 16 September 2021, Curis Wilbur arrived at her new home port of San Diego.

Awards
 Navy Unit Commendation – (Jan-May 2003)
 Navy Meritorious Unit Commendation – (Apr-Jul 1999, Jan-Dec 2001, Apr 2012-Dec 2013)
 Battle "E" – (1994, 1997, 2005)
 Humanitarian Service Medal – (17-28 Feb 2006, Mar-May 2011)
 Spokane Trophy Award – (2008)
 Captain Edward F. Ney Memorial Award – (2013).

Notes

References

External links

 USS Curtis Wilbur official website
 Yokosuka Naval Base Community Website
 

 

1992 ships
Arleigh Burke-class destroyers
Destroyers of the United States
Ships built in Bath, Maine